Flybe served the following destinations when it ceased operations on 5 March 2020. Destinations served solely by franchise partners Blue Islands and Eastern Airways are not included.

List

References 

Lists of airline destinations